Noah Cicero (born October 10, 1980) is an American novelist, short-story writer. He lives in Las Vegas, Nevada. He is the author of six books of fiction and two ebooks.

Cicero's stories, poetry, and essays have been published in magazines such as Scarecrow, Brittle Star, Retort, Nth Position, Black Ice, Identity Theory, Prague Literary Review, and many others. His fiction is anthologized in The Edgier Waters, published by 3:AM Magazine in 2006.

Bibliography
Novels
 The Human War (2003, Fugue State Press; foreign publications include Snowbooks, London 2007; as well as editions in Greek and German)
 The Condemned (2006, Six Gallery Press)
 Burning Babies (2006, Parlor Press)
 Treatise (2008, A-Head Publishing)
 The Insurgent (2010, Blatt)
 Best Behavior (2011, Civil Coping Mechanisms)
 Go to Work and Do Your Job. Care for Your Children. Pay Your Bills. Obey the Law. Buy Products. (2013, Lazy Fascist Press)
 Bipolar Cowboy (2015, Lazy Fascist Press) 
 Blood-Soaked Buddha/Hard Earth Pascal (2017, Trident Press)
  Las Vegas Bootlegger: Empire of Self-Importance (2020, Trident Press)
eBooks
 The Living And The Dead (2006, Bear Parade)
 Nosferatu (2008, Bear Parade)

References

LITERARY TOUR GUIDE: Vegas-based Writer Noah Cicero Takes His Fans On A Journey

Ones To Watch

Noah Cicero-IMDB

“I WANTED IT TO BE LIKE A COUNTRY SONG”: An Interview With Noah Cicero

Cicero, author, The Human War

Las Vegas Bootlegger: Noah Cicero and The Idea of Authenticity

The Death of Nihilism: A Review of Noah Cicero's GIVE IT TO THE GRAND CANYON

External links
Noah Cicero's blog
Cowboy Koans, a poem by Noah Cicero from Bipolar Cowboy

21st-century American dramatists and playwrights
21st-century American novelists
Writers from Youngstown, Ohio
Living people
1980 births
Postmodern writers
Alternative literature
21st-century American poets
American male novelists
American male essayists
American male poets
American male dramatists and playwrights
American male short story writers
21st-century American short story writers
21st-century American essayists
21st-century American male writers
Novelists from Ohio